Vaira Vīķe-Freiberga (born 1 December 1937) is a Latvian politician who served as the sixth President of Latvia from 1999 to 2007. She is the first woman to hold the post. She was elected President of Latvia in 1999 and re-elected for the second term in 2003.

Dr. Vaira Freiberga is a professor and interdisciplinary scholar, having published eleven books and numerous articles, essays and book chapters in addition to her extensive speaking engagements.
As President of the Republic of Latvia 1999–2007, she was instrumental in achieving membership in the European Union and NATO for her country. She is active in international politics, was named Special Envoy to the Secretary General on United Nations reform and was official candidate for UN Secretary General in 2006.

She remains active in the international arena and continues to speak in defense of liberty, equality and social justice, and for the need of Europe to acknowledge the whole of its history. She is a well-known pro-European, as such, in December 2007 she was named vice-chair of the Reflection group on the long-term future of the European Union. She is also known for her work in psycholinguistics, semiotics and analysis of the oral literature of her native country.

After her presidency Vaira Vīķe-Freiberga serving as a Founding Co-Chair of the Nizami Ganjavi International Center and served as the President of Club of Madrid, the world's largest forum of former Heads of State and Government, from 2014 to 2020. She is also a member of the International Programme Board of the Prague European Summit.

Early life and education 

Vaira Vīķe was born in Riga, Latvia. At the end of 1944, as the second Soviet occupation of Latvia began, her parents escaped to Nazi Germany. There she received her first education in Latvian primary school at a displaced persons camp in Lübeck, Germany, where her baby sister died. Then her family moved to Casablanca in French Morocco in 1949. In Morocco she attended French primary school at Daourat hydroelectric dam village where she learned the French language. She then went on to attend Collège de jeunes filles de Mers-Sultan in Casablanca. In 1954 her family moved to Toronto, Ontario, Canada, where she completed high school.

Vaira Vīķe attended Victoria College of the University of Toronto, graduating with a Bachelor of Arts in 1958 and a Master of Arts in 1960, in psychology. She worked at the Canadian Imperial Bank of Commerce as a teller and part-time as a supervisor in Branksome Hall Boarding School for Girls. In 1958, being fluent in English, French, Latvian, Spanish and German, she worked as a translator and the next year went on to work as a Spanish teacher for grades 12 and 13 at Ontario Ladies' College. Upon completion of her master's degree, Vīķe became a clinical psychologist at the Toronto Psychiatric Hospital in late 1960. She left in 1961 to resume her education at the McGill University in Montreal while also lecturing part-time at Concordia University. She earned her PhD in psychology from McGill University in 1965 with a dissertation supervised by Dr. Virginia Douglas, entitled Concept Learning in Normal and Hyperactive Children.

Professional life 
From 1965 to 1998 Vaira Vīķe-Freiberga pursued a professorial career at the Department of Psychology of the French-speaking University of Montreal, where she taught psychopharmacology, psycholinguistics, scientific theories, experimental methods, language and cognitive processes. Her experimental research focused on memory processes and language, and the influence of drugs on cognitive processes. At the same time she did scholarly research on semiotics, poetics and the structural analysis of computer-accessible texts from an oral tradition—the tradition of Latvian folksongs. During this period she authored ten books and about 160 articles, essays or book chapters and has given over 250 speeches, allocutions and scientific communications in English, French or Latvian, and gave numerous radio, TV and press interviews in various languages.

During that period Dr. Vīķe-Freiberga held prominent positions in national and international scientific and scholarly organizations, as well as in a number of Canadian governmental, institutional, academic and interdisciplinary committees, where she acquired extensive administrative experience. She is the recipient of many medals, prizes and honours for distinguished work in the humanities and social sciences.

In June 1998 she was elected Professor emerita at the University of Montreal and returned to her native land, Latvia, after a 54-year absence. On 19 October the Prime Minister named her Director of the newly founded Latvian Institute.

President of Latvia 
 Vaira Vīķe-Freiberga became President of Latvia in 1999. Although not a candidate in the first ballot, she was drafted by the Saeima (Latvian Parliament) and was elected to the office of President of Latvia on 20 June. She was sworn in on 8 July. Her approval rating ranged between 70% and 85%, and in 2003 she was re-elected for a second term of four years with 88 votes out of 96. 
She actively exercised the powers conferred on the President by the Constitution of the Republic of Latvia. She also played a leading role in achieving Latvia's membership in NATO and the European Union. She was an invited speaker at numerous international events (such as the joint session of the United States Congress, in June 2006), as well as an outspoken pundit on social issues, moral values, European historical dialogue, and democracy. During her presidency she regularly visited towns and villages to meet her constituents in person, and received many thousands of letters yearly from Latvians.

In April 2005, the United Nations Secretary-General Kofi Annan named Vīķe-Freiberga as a member of his team of global political leaders helping to promote his comprehensive reform agenda. In September 2006, the three Baltic States officially announced her candidacy for the post of United Nations Secretary-General.

Post-presidency 
Since the end of her presidency in July 2007, Dr. Vīķe-Freiberga has been actively participating as an invited speaker at a wide variety of international events. She is a founding member and former President of the Club of Madrid, a member of the European Council on Foreign Relations, and honorary patron of several Foundations. She was a member of the Support Committee of the 2007 European Book Prize and an honorary patron of the Paris Colloquium on the Teaching of European literatures. On 14 December 2007 she was appointed Vice-president of the Reflection Group on the long-term future of the European Union. In 2008, she became a member of the European Council on Tolerance and Reconciliation. During the Spring semester 2008 she was an invited Senior Fellow at the Institute of Politics, John F. Kennedy School of Government, Harvard University. She was chair of the European Research Area Board Identification Committee (2008), chair of the Review panel of the European Research Council (2009), and since December 2007, vice-chair of the Reflection group on the long-term future of the European Union. Vaira Vīķe-Freiberga has also been appointed on the Advisory Board of European Association of History Educators EUROCLIO. In October 2011, she was made chair of the European Commission High Level Expert Group on Media Freedom.

She was a candidate for the first permanent President of the European Council. Herman Van Rompuy was eventually chosen for that position. Vīķe-Freiberga has said that under the Lisbon Treaty and beyond, a federal Europe is desirable.

Vaira Vīķe-Freiberga is a member of :
the Global Leadership Foundation, an organization which works to support democratic leadership, prevent and resolve conflict through mediation and promote good governance in the form of democratic institutions, open markets, human rights and the rule of law. It does so by making available, discreetly and in confidence, the experience of former leaders to today's national leaders. It is a not-for-profit organization composed of former heads of government, senior governmental and international organization officials who work closely with Heads of Government on governance-related issues of concern to them.
the Fondation Chirac's honour committee, ever since the foundation was launched in 2008 by former French president Jacques Chirac in order to promote world peace. She also participates as jury member for the Prize for Conflict Prevention awarded every year by this foundation.
Vaira serves on the Leadership Council for Concordia, a nonpartisan, nonprofit based in New York City focused on promoting effective public-private collaboration to create a more prosperous and sustainable future.
Vaira is the Member of Board of Thinkers of Boston Global Forum
Vaira is a member of the advisory board of the Prague European Summit.

Medals and honors 
Vīķe-Freiberga has received many medals and awards, including the Golden Plate Award of the American Academy of Achievement in 2000, presented by Awards Council member General Joseph W. Ralston, USAF, Supreme Allied Commander Europe, at an awards ceremony at Hampton Court Palace, the 2005 Hannah Arendt Prize for political thought, the 2007 Emperor Otto Prize Prize for contributions in defining European identity and future, and the 2009 Friedrich-August-von-Hayek-Stiftung for promotion of freedom and free trade. She has been awarded 37 Orders of Merit and 16 Honorary Doctorates. She is a member of the Latvian Academy of Sciences, a fellow of the Royal Society of Canada and an associate member of the Royal Academy of Belgium. In 2013, she received the Knight of Freedom Award for her promotion of democratic values throughout the world, fighting for equality of women, as well as efforts for social justice.

 Commander Grand Cross with Chain of the Order of Three Stars (Latvia 08/07/1999)
 National Order of Quebec (Quebec, Canada, 2006)
 Grand Cross of the Viestura ordenis (Latvia, 2007)
 Grand Cross of the Cross of Recognition (Latvia, 2007)
 Collar of the Order of the Cross of Terra Mariana (Estonia, 2000)
 Dame Grand Cross of the Order of St. Olav (Norway, 2000)
 Grand Cross of the Order of the White Rose of Finland with Collar (Finland, 2001)
 Grand Cross of the Order of Vytautas the Great (Lithuania, 2001)
 Grand Cross special class of the Order of Merit of the Federal Republic of Germany (Germany, 2003)
 Grand Collar of the Order of Infante Dom Henrique (Portugal, 12 August 2003)
 Knight of the Order of the White Eagle (Poland, 2003)
 Knight Grand Cross with Grand Cordon of the Order of Merit of the Italian Republic (Italy, 2004)
 Collar of the Order of Isabella the Catholic (Spain, 2004)
 Grand Cross of the Order of Merit of the Republic of Poland (2005)
 Collar of the Order of the White Star (Estonia, 2005)
 Member of the Royal Order of the Seraphim (Sweden, 2005)
 Honorary Dame Grand Cross of the Order of the Bath (United Kingdom, 2006)
 Grand Cross of the Order of Adolphe of Nassau (Luxembourg, 2006)
 Grand Cordon of the Order of the Chrysanthemum (Japan, 2007)
 Grand Cordon of the Order of Leopold (Belgium) (Belgium, 2007)
 Global Women's Leadership Award, Global Summit of Women (Berlin, Germany, 2007)
The Truman-Reagan Medal of Freedom (2011)
 Dostlug Order (Azerbaijan, 2015)
Four biographies about President Vaira Vīķe-Freiberga have been published (in Latvian, English, French, Finnish, Italian, Russian and Spanish), and a full-length documentary film The Threefold Sun in 2008.

Family and personal life 
Vaira Vīķe-Freiberga is married to Imants Freibergs, formerly a professor of computer sciences at the University of Quebec at Montreal.  He was the President of the Latvian Information and Communications Technology Association (LIKTA) while his wife was President of Latvia. The couple met at the Latvian Students Club in Toronto. They have two children, Kārlis and Indra. Dr. Vīķe-Freiberga and Dr. I. Freibergs have founded a company “VVF Consulting” that offers consulting services to public and private organizations.

Selected works

See also 
 List of presidents of Latvia

References

Further reading 
 Torild Skard (2014) 'Vaira Vike-Freiberga' "Women of power - half a century of female presidents and prime ministers worldwide", Bristol: Policy Press

External links 

 Website of Vaira Vīķe-Freiberga
 Vaira Vīķe-Freiberga on Official website of the Chancery of the President of Latvia
 Cosmopolis interview with President Vike-Freiberga
A Campaign of the World Federalist Movement
 Site in support of her candidature to head the European Council 
 

|-

1937 births
Women presidents
Latvian World War II refugees
Latvian women writers
Living people
McGill University Faculty of Science alumni
Officers of the National Order of Quebec
Politicians from Riga
Presidents of Latvia
Academic staff of the Université de Montréal
University of Toronto alumni
Collars of the Order of Isabella the Catholic
Fellows of the Royal Society of Canada
Grand Collars of the Order of Prince Henry
Grand Crosses of the Order of Merit of the Republic of Poland
Grand Crosses of the Order of Vytautas the Great
Grand Crosses Special Class of the Order of Merit of the Federal Republic of Germany
Knights Grand Cross with Collar of the Order of Merit of the Italian Republic
Honorary Dames Grand Cross of the Order of the Bath
Recipients of the Collar of the Order of the Cross of Terra Mariana
Recipients of the Order of the Star of Romania
Recipients of the Cross of Recognition
20th-century women rulers
20th-century Latvian women politicians
21st-century Latvian women politicians
Latvian emigrants to Canada
Recipients of the Order of the White Eagle (Poland)
Presidents of the Canadian Psychological Association
Female heads of state
Latvian psychologists
Recipients of the Order of Prince Yaroslav the Wise, 1st class